Fayez Al-Malki (Arabic: فايز المالكي; born September 12, 1969) is a Saudi Arabian television actor and humanitarian. He is best known as Menahi, a character he portrayed in several works such as Menahi's diary (2006) and Menahi (2009).

Background 
Al-Malki was born in Haddad Bani Malik, Ta'if, his brother is Ali Al-Malki, an Islamic preacher. Al-Malki began his career in theater in 1985, where he worked in many theatrical works during that period via portraying a comic character known at the time as Abu Rannah. His television debut in the first season of Saudi Arabian comedy, Tash ma Tash (No Big Deal) in 1993.

In 2009, he was featured in the list of Arabian Business 100 Inspiring leaders in the Middle East and honored at the King Fahd Cultural Center in Riyadh.

On August 31, 2009, he was chosen as a Goodwill ambassador for UNICEF in the Persian Gulf region. Al-Malki resigned from the position in 2012 because of their stance regarding the Syrian crisis.

In 2015, Mohammed bin Rashid Al Maktoum awarded AL-Malki the Arab Social Media Influencers Award in Community Service category at the Arab Social Media Influencers Summit held in Dubai World Trade Centre.

In 2017, he was awarded the New Media Award represented by the Saudi Ministry of Media.

Al-Malki has hosted several talk shows such as Tonight with Fayez which premiered on Dubai TV in 2012 and Host in our house premiered in 2016.

Filmography

Television

Film

Theater

References

External links 
 

Living people
1969 births
Saudi Arabian actors
Saudi Arabian male stage actors
United Nations goodwill ambassadors
Saudi Arabian male  comedians
Saudi Arabian male film actors
Saudi Arabian male television actors
People from Taif